Phan Thanh Hung may refer to:

Phan Thanh Hùng (1960), Vietnamese footballer and manager
Phan Thanh Hưng (1987), Vietnamese footballer